Frank Broeze (18 August 1945 – 4 April 2001) was a professor of history at the University of Western Australia. His special area of interest was maritime history.

Life and work

Born Franklin Jan Aart Broeze in Rijswijk, Netherlands, Broeze was a maritime historian, and one of the founders of the Australian Association for Maritime History. He was also one of the founders of the International Maritime History Association which later became the International Maritime Economic History Association. He published widely on maritime history issues as well as editing The Great Circle, the journal of the Australian Association for Maritime History. He wrote ten books and had more than 100 articles published in academic journals.

Broeze died on 4 April 2001 in Perth, Western Australia. The Frank Broeze Memorial Maritime History Book Prize was created by the Australian National Maritime Museum in his memory. In addition, a memorial lecture was inaugurated and is held each year.

Notes

1945 births
2001 deaths
Australian maritime historians
20th-century Australian historians
People from Rijswijk
Academic staff of the University of Western Australia
Historians from Western Australia
Dutch maritime historians